Ohio's 7th congressional district is represented by Max Miller. It is currently located in the northeastern section of the state, including part of Cuyahoga County.

Election results from presidential races

List of members representing the district

Recent election results 
The following chart shows historic election results. Bold type indicates victor. Italic type indicates incumbent.

Historical district boundaries

See also
Ohio's congressional districts
List of United States congressional districts

References

 Congressional Biographical Directory of the United States 1774–present

07
Constituencies established in 1823
1823 establishments in Ohio